Salvador E. Casellas (June 10, 1935 – November 22, 2017) was a United States district judge of the United States District Court for the District of Puerto Rico.

Education and career

Born in San Juan, Puerto Rico, Casellas graduated from the Academia del Perpetuo Socorro in 1953, with High Honors. He received a Bachelor of Science in Foreign Service from Georgetown University in 1957, a Bachelor of Laws from the University of Puerto Rico Law School in 1960, and a Master of Laws from Harvard Law School in 1961. Served in the United States Army as a Second Lieutenant in the United States Army Armor Branch from 1961 to 1963, and remained in the United States Army Reserve in the Judge Advocate General's Corps from 1963 to 1967. He was in private practice in San Juan from 1962 to 1972. He served as Secretary of the Treasury for the Commonwealth of Puerto Rico from 1973 to 1976, thereafter returning to private practice in San Juan from 1977 to 1994.

Federal judicial service

On June 21, 1994, Casellas was nominated by President Bill Clinton to a seat on the United States District Court for the District of Puerto Rico vacated by Jaime Pieras, Jr. Casellas was confirmed by the United States Senate on September 28, 1994, and received his commission on September 29, 1994. He assumed senior status on June 10, 2005. Judge Casellas passed away on November 22, 2017 at Auxilio Mutuo Hospital in Hato Rey, Puerto Rico.

See also
List of Hispanic/Latino American jurists

References

External links 
 

1935 births
2017 deaths
20th-century American judges
21st-century American judges
Harvard Law School alumni
Hispanic and Latino American judges
Judges of the United States District Court for the District of Puerto Rico
People from San Juan, Puerto Rico
Secretaries of Treasury of Puerto Rico
United States Army officers
United States Army reservists
United States district court judges appointed by Bill Clinton
University of Puerto Rico alumni
Walsh School of Foreign Service alumni